The Western Bulldogs are an Australian rules football team based in Melbourne, Victoria. Their 2021 season is their 96th season in the Australian Football League (AFL), their seventh season under premiership coach Luke Beveridge, and their second season with Marcus Bontempelli as captain. By the end of the home-and-away season, they finished fifth with 15 wins and 7 losses despite topping the ladder for eight weeks. Nevertheless, they were able to make the 2021 Grand Final against Melbourne, where they lost by 74 points to finish the year as runner-up.

Background

The Western Bulldogs are an Australian rules football team based in Melbourne, Victoria, that competes in the Australian Football League (AFL). They ended the 2020 home-and-away season seventh on the ladder. Their season ended after  beat them in the first week of the finals; however, they were able to make the 2021 Grand Final against Melbourne, scheduled for Saturday 25 September 2021.

In the off season, Marcus Bontempelli was named captain of the Western Bulldogs for the second year in a row. Mitch Wallis was named as the vice-captain, which was a role formerly held by Easton Wood. The leadership group was abolished, with players being asked to 'take on more responsibility to guide the team forward'.

Luke Beveridge was head coach for a seventh season.

The Western Bulldogs continued with Mexican foods supplier company Mission Foods as their major sponsor for 2021.

Playing list

2020 off-season changes
At the end of their 2020 season, the Western Bulldogs delisted 2018 leading goalkicker Billy Gowers and 2016 draftees Fergus Greene and Brad Lynch. Veterans Jackson Trengove and Matthew Suckling, as well as 2017 draftee Callum Porter, were delisted after the trade period. They received out-of-favour  midfielder Adam Treloar and picks 26, 33 and 42 in exchange for a first-round and future second-round pick. Finally, Mitch Hannan was also traded to the Bulldogs in exchange for a future third-round pick.

In the 2020 AFL draft, the Bulldogs drafted Next Generation Academy graduate Jamarra Ugle-Hagan with the first pick of the 2020 AFL draft as well as small forward Dominic Bedendo with pick 55. They also obtained midfielder/forward Lachlan McNeil at the rookie draft with pick 11.

Statistics

Season summary
The fixture for the 2021 season was revealed in December 2020, with each team scheduled to play 22 matches and have a mid-season bye, as was normal prior to COVID-19. Only the first six rounds had times and dates set for the matches, with the remaining dates being confirmed at a later date.

The Western Bulldogs' first match of the season was against  at the Melbourne Cricket Ground. The Bulldogs secured their first win of the season, a 16-point win, after leading the entire game. This saw former  player Adam Treloar play against his old club for the first time. In Round 2, the Bulldogs played  at Marvel Stadium. The game was very even, with the lead switching 11 times throughout the game. Although the Eagles lead by 2 goals at three quarter time, the Bulldogs kicked 5 goals to 2, with Bontempelli kicking the sealer, in order to secure the win, which was described as 'the best game of 2021 so far'.

Round 3 saw the team make history as they brutally demolished  in the Good Friday marquee match by 128 points, their biggest winning margin in the club's history. Josh Bruce kicked 10 goals, the biggest amount kicked by an AFL player since Ben Brown in 2019. The win propelled them to the top spot of the ladder, with a percentage of 181.6. Round 4 saw the club continue their undefeated streak, after they beat 2020 preliminary finalists  by 19 points on a windy day at Mars Stadium in Ballarat. Ruckman turned forward Tim English, new recruit Adam Treloar and the ever-consistent Jack Macrae were named as the team's best on ground after they collected a combined 78 disposals and 4 goals.

The Bulldogs went undefeated for the first five games in a season for the first time since 1946 as they beat  by 62 points in a fierce display at Marvel Stadium, scoring 11 goals to 1 in the opening half as 150 gamer Marcus Bontempelli led the way. After conceding the third quarter to the Suns, they pulled away in the final quarter to win by their 2nd biggest margin up to that point. Their undefeated streak continued the following week as the Bulldogs pulled away in a back and forward slog against  to claim the victory by 39 points. Lin Jong came back into the team only to injure his hamstring in his fourth game in the senior team since 2018, while the ever-consistent Josh Dunkley dislocated his shoulder and ruckman-turned forward Tim English suffered a head knock.

The Bulldogs suffered their first loss for the season in Round 7 after they lost to reigning premiers  by 22 points. Despite leading at half time, they could not hold out against the Tigers, who had been inaccurate in the first half. After being down 27 points at one stage in the third quarter, the Bulldogs grinded out a win against  in Round 8, with Bruce and Bontempelli among the best performers for that game after collecting 32 disposals and 5 goals, respectively. The next week saw the team travel to Adelaide Oval to face , where they secured a 19-point win. After kicking 6 goals to 2 in the first term, the exact opposite occurred in the second, with the Bulldogs conceding 6 goals and kicking 2 themselves. However, they managed to pull through with late goals to Cody Weightman and Aaron Naughton, sealing the win.

The Bulldogs again made history in Round 10, recording their biggest-ever win against the Saints and recording two 100-point wins for the first time in one season. Their 111-point victory saw the Bulldogs narrowly keep on top in the first quarter, with a 3-goal-to-2 quarter seeing inaccurate kicking from both sides. However, from there, the Bulldogs would kick 18 of the next 21 goals, with 5 players for the Bulldogs scoring multiple goals. The game was played without crowds due to the impact of the pandemic lockdown occurring in Victoria that week. The team secured another win against  at Perth Stadium in Round 12, running out 28-point victors after some inaccurate kicking at goal. It was their first win in the state of Western Australia since the 2016 Elimination Final against the West Coast Eagles, which that year saw them progress into the 2016 finals series.

The Western Bulldogs lost their ladder position in the last few weeks of the home-and-away season, slipping from first to fifth. However, they scored wins against Essendon, Brisbane, and Port Adelaide in the finals to qualify for the 2021 Grand Final against Melbourne.

Results

Notelist

Ladder

References

External links
 Official website of the Western Bulldogs
 Official website of the Australian Football League

Western Bulldogs seasons
2021 Australian Football League season